Emilia is a historical region of northern Italy, which approximately corresponds to the western and the north-eastern portions of the modern region of Emilia-Romagna, with the area of Romagna forming the remainder of the modern region.

Etymology

Emilia takes its name from the Via Aemilia, a Roman road constructed by the consul Marcus Aemilius Lepidus in 187 BCE to connect Rimini with Piacenza. The name was transferred to the district (which formed the eighth Augustan region of Italy) as early as the time of Martial, in popular usage. In the 2nd and 3rd centuries Aemilia was frequently named as a district under imperial judges, generally in combination with Flaminia or Liguria and Tuscia.

The district of Ravenna was, as a rule, from the 3rd to the 5th century, not treated as part of Aemilia, the chief town of the latter being Placentia (Piacenza). In the 4th century Aemilia and Liguria were joined to form a consular province; after that Aemilia stood alone, Ravenna being sometimes temporarily added to it.

Under the Byzantine Empire Ravenna became the seat of an exarch, and after the Lombards had for two centuries attempted to subdue the Pentapolis (Ravenna, Bologna, Forlì, Faenza, Rimini), Pepin took these cities from the Lombard king Aistulf and gave them, with the March of Ancona, to the papacy in 755, to which, under the name of Romagna, they continued to belong. At first, however, the archbishop of Ravenna was in reality supreme. The other chief cities of Emilia—Ferrara, Modena, Reggio, Parma, Piacenza—were, on the other hand, independent, and in the period of the communal independence of the individual towns of Italy each of the chief cities of Emilia, whether belonging to Romagna or not, had a history of its own. Notwithstanding the feuds of Guelphs and Ghibellines, they prospered considerably. The study of Roman law, especially at Bologna, acquired great importance. The imperial influence kept the papal power in check.

Pope Nicholas III obtained control of Romagna in 1278, but the papal dominion almost fell during the Avignon Papacy, and was only maintained by the efforts of Cardinal Albornoz, who was sent to Italy by Pope Innocent VI in 1353. Even so, however, papal supremacy existed in  little more than name only. This state of affairs only ceased when Cesare Borgia crushed most of the petty princes of Romagna, intending to found a dynasty of his own there. 

Upon the death of Pope Alexander VI it was his successors in the papacy who carried on and profited by what Cesare Borgia had begun. The towns were thenceforth subject to the church and administered by cardinal legates. Ferrara and Comacchio remained under the House of Este until the death of Alfonso II in 1597, when they were claimed by Pope Clement VIII as vacant fiefs.

Modena and Reggio, which had formed part of the Ferrara duchy, were thenceforth a separate duchy under a branch of the house of Este. Carpi and Mirandola were small principalities, the former of which passed to the house of Este in 1525, in which year the emperor Charles V expelled the Pio family, while the last of the Pico dynasty of Mirandola, Francesco Maria Pico, having sided with the French in the War of the Spanish Succession, was deprived of his duchy in 1709 by the emperor Joseph I, who sold it to the house of Este in 1710. Parma and Piacenza were at first under the Farnese, Pope Paul III having placed his son Pier Luigi in that role in 1545, and then, after the extinction of the family in 1731, under a secondary branch of the Bourbons of Spain.

In 1821 and in 1831 there were unsuccessful attempts at revolt in Emilia; another attempt in 1848 to 1849 was crushed by Austrian troops. In 1859, the struggle for independence was finally successful, Emilia passing to the Italian kingdom almost without resistance.

Boundaries

The eastern boundary is formed by the rivers Sillaro and Reno, which divide it from Romagna. To the north the river Po forms its border with Veneto and Lombardy. To the west and south the Apennine drainage divide separates it from Liguria and Tuscany. Administratively it comprises the provinces of Piacenza, Parma, Reggio Emilia, Modena, Bologna (except for the commune of Imola and Dozza, and the valley of the Santerno) and Ferrara.

The region corresponds approximately to the ancient Cispadane Gaul which, under the Augustan territorial organisation of Italia c. 7 CE, became Regio VIII Aemilia.

Language

Although Italian is the most widely spoken language today, the local Emilian language is also spoken.

References

 

 
Geographical, historical and cultural regions of Italy
History of Emilia-Romagna